Elbe-Heide is a Verbandsgemeinde ("collective municipality") in the Börde district, in Saxony-Anhalt, Germany. Before 1 January 2010, it was a Verwaltungsgemeinschaft. It is situated on the left bank of the Elbe, northwest of Burg bei Magdeburg. The seat of the Verbandsgemeinde is in Rogätz.

The Verbandsgemeinde Elbe-Heide consists of the following municipalities (population in 2006 between brackets):

 Angern (2,264)
 Burgstall (1,777)
 Colbitz (3,419)
 Loitsche-Heinrichsberg (1,060)
 Rogätz (2,219)
 Westheide (1,857)
 Zielitz (2,013)

References

Verbandsgemeinden in Saxony-Anhalt